Archbishop of Beirut may refer to:

 Greek Orthodox Archbishop of Beirut, an Eastern Orthodox archbishop, seated in Beirut
 Syriac Orthodox Archbishop of Beirut, an Oriental Orthodox archbishop, seated in Beirut
 Greek Catholic Archbishop of Beirut, a Greek Catholic archbishop, seated in Beirut
 Maronite Catholic Archbishop of Beirut, a Maronite Catholic archbishop, seated in Beirut

See also 
 Archdiocese of Beirut (disambiguation) 
 Diocese of Beirut (disambiguation)
 Christianity in Lebanon